Psilosticha attacta is a moth of the family Geometridae first described by Francis Walker in 1860. It is found in Australia.

References

Boarmiini
Moths of Australia
Moths described in 1860